This is a list of species in the lichenised ascomycete genus Menegazzia. , Species Fungorum accepts 76 species of Menegazzia.

Menegazzia abscondita G.Kantvilas (2012)
Menegazzia aeneofusca (Müll.Arg.) R.Sant. (1942)
Menegazzia albida (Zahlbr.) R.Sant. (1942)
Menegazzia anteforata Aptroot, M.-J.Lai, & Sparrius (2003)
Menegazzia asahinae (Yasuda ex Asahina) R.Sant. (1942)
Menegazzia asekiensis Elix (2007)
Menegazzia athrotaxidis G.Kantvilas (2012)
Menegazzia aucklandica (Zahlbr.) P.James & D.J.Galloway (1983)
Menegazzia bjerkeana Kantvilas (2012)
Menegazzia brattii Kantvilas (2012)
Menegazzia caesiopruinosa P.James (1987)
Menegazzia caliginosa P.James & D.J.Galloway (1983)
Menegazzia capitata Sipman & Bjerke (2007)
Menegazzia castanea P.James & D.J.Galloway (1983)
Menegazzia caviisidia Bjerke & P.James (2004)
Menegazzia chrysogaster Bjerke & Elvebakk (2001)
Menegazzia cincinnata (Kremp.) Bitter (1901)
Menegazzia confusa P.James (1987)
Menegazzia conica P.James (1992)
Menegazzia corrugata P.James (1992)
Menegazzia dielsii (Hillmann) R.Sant. (1942)
Menegazzia digitiformis P.James, Aptroot, Sérus. & Diederich (2001)
Menegazzia dispora (Nyl.) R.Sant. (1942)
Menegazzia dissoluta P.James, Aptroot, Sérus. & Diederich (2001)
Menegazzia efflorescens P.James, Aptroot, Sérus. & Diederich (2001)
Menegazzia endocrocea Kantvilas (2012)
Menegazzia elongata P.James (1992)
Menegazzia enteroxantha (Müll.Arg.) R.Sant. (1942)
Menegazzia eperforata P.James & D.J.Galloway (1983)
Menegazzia faminensis Elix (2007)
Menegazzia fertilis P.James (1992)
Menegazzia fissicarpa P.James (1992)
Menegazzia foraminulosa (Kremp.) Bitter (1901)
Menegazzia fortuita Elix & P.M.McCarthy (2017)
Menegazzia fumarprotocetrarica Calvelo & Adler (1996)
Menegazzia gallowayi Kantvilas (2012)
Menegazzia globoisidiata Elix (2007)
Menegazzia globulifera R. Sant. (1942)
Menegazzia grandis P.James (1992)
Menegazzia hollermayeri (Räsänen) R.Sant. (1942)
Menegazzia hypernota Bjerke (2004)
Menegazzia hypogymnioides G.Kantvilas (2012)
Menegazzia inactiva P.James & Kantvilas (1987)
Menegazzia inflata (Hillmann) P.James & D.J.Galloway (1983)
Menegazzia isidiata P.James, Aptroot, Sérus. & Diederich (2001)
Menegazzia jamesii Louwhoff & Kantvilas (2004)
Menegazzia kantvillasii P.James (1992)
Menegazzia kawesqarica Bjerke & Elvebakk (2001)
Menegazzia lordhowensis Elix (2007)
Menegazzia lucens P.James & D.J.Galloway (1983)
Menegazzia magellanica R.Sant (1942)
Menegazzia malesiana Elix, Bawingan & Schumm (2005)
Menegazzia megalospora (Räsänen) R.Sant. (1942)
Menegazzia megathallina P.James, Aptroot, Sérus. & Diederich (2001)
Menegazzia menyamyaensis Elix (2008)
Menegazzia minuta P.James & Kantvilas (1987)
Menegazzia monospora Bjerke & Sipman (2007)
Menegazzia myriotrema (Müll.Arg.) R.Sant. (1942)
Menegazzia neotropica Bjerke (2002)
Menegazzia neozelandica (Zahlbr.) P.James (1992)
Menegazzia nipponica K.H.Moon, Kurok. & Kashiw. (2006)
Menegazzia norsorediata Adler & Calvelo (1996)
Menegazzia norstictica P.James (1992)
Menegazzia nothofagi (Zahlbr.) P.James & D.J.Galloway (1983)
Menegazzia opuntioides (Müll. Arg.) R.Sant. (1942)
Menegazzia pedicellata Bjerke (2004)
Menegazzia pendula P.James, Aptroot, Sérus. & Diederich (2001)
Menegazzia pertransita (Stirt.) R.Sant. (1942)
Menegazzia petraea G.Kantvilas (2012)
Menegazzia platytrema (Müll. Arg.) R.Sant. (1942)
Menegazzia primaria Aptroot, M.-J.Lai, & Sparrius (2003)
Menegazzia prototypica P.James (1992)
Menegazzia pseudocyphellata Aptroot, M.-J.Lai, & Sparrius (2003)
Menegazzia pulchra P.James & D.J.Galloway (1983)
Menegazzia ramulicola G.Kantvilas (2012)
Menegazzia sabahensis Bjerke & Sipman (2007)
Menegazzia sanguinascens (Räsänen) R.Sant. (1942)
Menegazzia saxicola P.James & Aptroot (2001)
Menegazzia squamatica K.H.Moon, Kurok. & Kashiw. (2006)
Menegazzia stellata P.James, Aptroot, Sérus. & Diederich (2001)
Menegazzia stirtonii (Zahlbr.) Kantvilas & Louwhoff (2004)
Menegazzia subbullata P.James & Kantvilas (1987)
Menegazzia subpertusa P.James & D.J.Galloway (1983)
Menegazzia subsimilis (H.Magn.) R.Sant. (1942)
Menegazzia subtestacea G.Kantvilas (2012)
Menegazzia tarkinea G.Kantvilas (2012)
Menegazzia tenuis R.Sant. (1942)
Menegazzia terebrata (Hoffm.) A.Massal (1854)
Menegazzia testacea P.James & D.J.Galloway (1983)
Menegazzia ultralucens P.James & D.J.Galloway (1983)
Menegazzia valdiviensis (Räsänen) R.Sant. (1942)
Menegazzia violascens (Räsänen) Bjerke (2005)
Menegazzia wandae Bjerke (2001)
Menegazzia weindorferi (Zahlbr.) R.Sant. (1942)
Menegazzia williamsii Kantvilas (2019)
Menegazzia wilsonii (Räsänen) Bjerke (2005)

References

List
Menegazzia